Naresh  Yadav (AAP) is an Indian politician and a member of the Delhi Legislative Assembly in India. He represents the Mehrauli constituency of the National capital territory of Delhi and is a member of the Aam Aadmi Party.

Early life and education
Naresh  Yadav was born in Delhi. He attended the Chaudhary Charan Singh University and attained Bachelor of Laws degree.

Political career
Naresh Yadav is a Member Of Legislative Assembly in the Legislative Assembly of Delhi. He was elected twice as the representative from the Mehrauli constituency with the candidacy of the Aam Aadmi Party. In the 2015 Delhi Legislative Assembly election, he polled 51.06% of the votes and won with a margin of 16,591. In the 2020 Delhi Legislative Assembly election, he increased his vote share, polling 54.27% of the votes and won with a margin of 18,161.

Assassination attempt 
The results of the 2020 Delhi Legislative Assembly were declared on 11 February 2020. On the night of the same day, while he was returning from a temple visit, the convoy escorting Naresh Yadav was shot at. It resulted in the death of an accompanying Aam Aadmi Party volunteer and he was injured during the incident. The perpetrator was arrested and it appears that he was known to Naresh and to the volunteer.

Member of Legislative Assembly (2020 - present)
Since 2020, he is an elected member of the 7th Delhi Assembly.

Committee assignments of Delhi Legislative Assembly 
 Member (2022-2023), Committee on Estimates

Posts held

See also
Aam Aadmi Party
Delhi Legislative Assembly
Government of India
Mehrauli (Delhi Assembly constituency)
Politics of India
Sixth Legislative Assembly of Delhi

Electoral performance

References

External links
 

1972 births
Aam Aadmi Party politicians from Delhi
Delhi MLAs 2015–2020
Delhi MLAs 2020–2025
Living people
People from South Delhi district
People from New Delhi